This is the discography documenting albums released by Lars Winnerbäck.

Albums

Studio albums

Live albums

Compilation albums

Extended plays
 Bränt krut vol. 2 (2005)
 Själ och hjärta, del 1 (2021)

Singles

Other charted songs

Notes

References

Discographies of Swedish artists